"Luv Your Life" is a song by Australian rock band Silverchair released as the third single from their fourth album, Diorama, on September 2, 2002. The song was composed in the key of C major, and a music video was made in which the band was portrayed as animated characters. This is mostly because frontman Daniel Johns was incapacitated by his reactive arthritis, and the band needed to release another song to prevent commercial momentum for the album from coming to a complete halt. "Luv Your Life" was dedicated by Johns to "all my ladies", and was written on piano and featured an orchestral arrangement by Van Dyke Parks. Bassist Chris Joannou stated that this song is his favourite off the album. The single peaked at number 20 on the Australian Recording Industry Association Singles Chart.

Music video
The animated music video was directed by Steve Scott and James Littlemore. When watching the video, one can see that Chris Joannou and Ben Gillies' animated characters seem to be more fluid and realistic than Daniel's. This may be due to Chris and Ben doing some sort of motion capture for the making of the video.

Track listings
Australian CD single (ELEVENCD10)

 "Luv Your Life"
 "The Greatest View" (on Rove Live)
 "Without You" (on Rove Live)
 Rove Live interview with Daniel Johns (audio)
 Rove Live interview with Daniel Johns (video)

 Tracks 2, 3, 4, and 5 were recorded live on 2 April 2002 on Rove Live.

Australian 7" promo vinyl (ltd 500 copies, now deleted) (ELEVENV10)

 "Luv Your Life"
 "Luv Your Life" (Van Dyke Parks Premix)

UK CD Single (7567853812)
 "Luv Your Life"
 "Asylum"
 "Hollywood"
 "Ramble"

Charts

References

External links
 
 

2002 singles
Silverchair songs
Songs written by Daniel Johns
Rock ballads
2002 songs
Eleven: A Music Company singles
Virgin Records singles
Atlantic Records singles
Song recordings produced by David Bottrill
Animated music videos